The Arrow Hotel is a historic hotel building in Broken Bow, Nebraska. It was built on the site of the demolished 1883 Commercial Hotel by C.E. Atwater in 1928, and designed in the Prairie School style by John Latenser & Sons. Inside, there are four murals by Tom Talbot, who maintained a studio in the hotel in the 1960s. The building has been listed on the National Register of Historic Places since September 12, 1985.

References

National Register of Historic Places in Custer County, Nebraska
Prairie School architecture in Nebraska
Hotel buildings completed in 1928